Insein is a village in Kale Township, Kale District, in the Sagaing Region of western Burma.

References

External links
Maplandia World Gazetteer

See also
Insein Prison
Insein Township

Populated places in Kale District
Kale Township